The Sunday Times / University of Warwick Young Writer of the Year award is a literary prize awarded to a British author under the age of 35 for a published work of fiction, non-fiction or poetry. It is administered by the Society of Authors and has been running since 1991.

History
The Sunday Times Young Writer of the Year Award is said here to have originally run between 1991 and 2009, but there is evidence to confirm that it began twenty years earlier. At that time entries confined to short stories and were published in the newspaper itself. The 1974 winner was Charles Nicholl, who went on to become well-known for historical biographies. "The Ups and The Downs" was Charles Nicholl's disturbing and humorous account of a bad LSD trip in London.

It was re-invigorated with the support of literary agents Peters Fraser + Dunlop in 2015 under the new name Sunday Times / Peters Fraser + Dunlop Young Writer of the Year Award.

In 2019 the University of Warwick took over as co-sponsor. The award was renamed as The Sunday Times / University of Warwick Young Writer of the Year Award.

In 1999, Paul Farley's The Boy from the Chemist is Here to See You "was so well received", according to the Encyclopedia of British Writers, that "it was named Sunday Times Young Writer of the Year Award".

Winners
Cal Flyn, Islands of Abandonment (2021)
Jay Bernard, Surge (2020)
Raymond Antrobus, The Perseverance (2019)
Adam Weymouth, Kings of the Yukon: An Alaskan River Journey (2018)
Sally Rooney, Conversations with Friends (2017)
Max Porter, Grief Is The Thing With Feathers (2016)
Sarah Howe, Loop of Jade (2015)
Ross Raisin, God's Own Country (2009)
Adam Foulds, The Truth about these Strange Times (2008)
Naomi Alderman, Disobedience (2007)
Robert Macfarlane, Mountains of the Mind (2004)
William Fiennes, The Snow Geese (2003)
Zadie Smith, White Teeth (2001)
Sarah Waters, Affinity (2000)
Paul Farley, The Boy from the Chemist is Here to See You (1999) 
Patrick French, Liberty or Death (1998)
Francis Spufford, I May Be Some Time (1997)
Katherine Pierpoint, Truffle Beds (1996)
Andrew Cowan, Pig (1995)
William Dalrymple, City of Djinns (1994)
Simon Armitage, Xanadu and Kid (1993)
Caryl Phillips, Cambridge (1992) 
Helen Simpson, Four Bare Legs in a Bed (1991) 

No award was made in 2002, 2005 or 2006.

References

Society of Authors awards
Literary awards honouring young writers
Awards established in 1991
1991 establishments in the United Kingdom
Young Writer of the Year
Literary awards by magazines and newspapers